John W. Lewis III (born August 5, 1949) is a former American politician in the state of Florida.

Lewis was born in Georgia and came to Florida with his family in 1950. He served in the Florida House of Representatives for the 18th district from 1974 to 1986, as a Democrat.

References

External links 

1949 births
Living people
Democratic Party members of the Florida House of Representatives